Jaime Silva (born Almeida, Almeida, Guarda, 21 February 1954) was a Minister of Agriculture, Rural Development and Fisheries of Portugal in the XVII Governo Constitucional administration team headed by Prime Minister José Sócrates.  He was first appointed to the ministry in March 2005 and continued in this position until 2009 legislative elections.

References

Government ministers of Portugal
Technical University of Lisbon alumni
Agriculture ministers of Portugal
Living people
People from Guarda District
1954 births